Donald Hugh McClelland, Jr., known as Deke McClelland (born 1962), is an American author and expert in Adobe products, most notably Photoshop, but also Illustrator, InDesign and Photoshop Elements.

Bibliography

Training videos 

He has hosted over 80 video tutorials, totaling upwards of 2000 hours for different Adobe Applications (mainly Photoshop, InDesign and Illustrator)

Lynda.com has a full list of video tutorials hosted by McClelland.

Awards 
 The Benjamin Franklin Award for Best Computer Book (1989)
 Inducted into the Photoshop Hall of Fame (2002)

Personal life 
McClelland lives in Boulder, Colorado, with his two sons.

References

External links
 

Living people
American male non-fiction writers
American non-fiction writers
1962 births